Dindicodes davidaria is a moth of the family Geometridae first described by Gustave Arthur Poujade in 1895. It is found in western China.

References

Moths described in 1895
Pseudoterpnini